Thophini is a tribe of cicadas in the family Cicadidae, found in Australia. There are at least two genera and about nine described species in Thophini.

Genera
These two genera belong to the tribe Thophini:
 Arunta Distant, 1904
 Thopha Amyot & Audinet-Serville, 1843

References

Further reading

 
 
 
 
 
 
 
 
 
 
 

 
Cicadinae
Hemiptera tribes